Carl "CJ" Johnson is a fictional character and the playable protagonist of the 2004 video game Grand Theft Auto: San Andreas, the fifth main installment in Rockstar Games' Grand Theft Auto series. He is voiced by Young Maylay, who also served as the likeness for the character.

In the game's storyline, Carl is depicted as the underboss of the Grove Street Families, a fictional street gang based in his home city of Los Santos, San Andreas (a fictional parody of Los Angeles, California). The gang is led by his older brother, "Sweet" Johnson, with whom Carl became estranged after the death of their younger brother, Brian, in a gang-related attack prior to the events of the game. Feeling his life in Los Santos is unpromising, Carl eventually decides to move to Liberty City, only to return home five years later after his mother, Beverly, is similarly killed. While seeking to make amends with friends and family for abandoning them, Carl returns to his previous gangster lifestyle as he embarks on an eventful journey across the entire state of San Andreas, which sees him making new allies and clashing with several powerful criminal organisations and corrupt authorities. Although initially portrayed as somewhat naïve, clumsy, and selfish, Carl develops over the course of San Andreas' storyline, both on a professional level, becoming a successful criminal and businessman, and on an emotional level, as he learns to appreciate his roots and those around him.

Carl received critical acclaim, with praise going to his complexity, lack of stereotype and his sense of conscience, and is regarded as one of the greatest video game characters of all time.

Concept and design

Portrayal
Carl's physical appearance is modeled after Los Angeles-based rapper and actor Young Maylay, who also provided the character's voice and motion-capture work. When asked about the character model for Carl, Young Maylay stated that the development team took "very professional" photographs of him to model Carl.

Maylay stated that he was influenced by his own life when portraying Carl. "[The development team] wanted authentic L.A., that's where I'm from and they knew that, so that's what I gave 'em," he added. "I put Maylay on CJ. I make him as much me as I can, without too much changing of the script."

Customisation
Unlike the principal characters of previous Grand Theft Auto games, Carl's appearance is highly customisable, as the player can purchase a wide variety of different haircuts, tattoos, and clothing for him. Certain clothes, tattoos, and hairstyles improve or worsen Carl's standing with his fellow gang members as well as his sex appeal to his selective girlfriends, and the opinions of wandering pedestrians.

The game implements a tracking system for various skills and abilities, each of which gradually improves as it is used or practiced and slowly diminishes if it is neglected. As Carl rides bikes, drives cars and motorcycles, and flies aircraft, his skill improves in each. The same is true for the weapons that he uses. The player can choose to exercise as well, which improves skills such as stamina, (which allows Carl to sprint for longer durations) and muscle (which visibly increases Carl's muscle tone, size and affects his hand-to-hand combat damage, physical endurance and respect status). If he becomes too muscular, he will have less mobility. Visiting fast food restaurants and regularly consuming their meals will increase Carl's size over time, and if Carl eats too much without cardio exercise, he will become overweight which results in a heavy loss of mobility. Carl can lose this weight by regularly running, or by using certain exercise machines. Using the gym is completely optional, and Carl's body statistics will increase or decrease naturally over time, depending on their activities in the game's world; such as climbing, jogging, swimming and jumping.

Fictional character biography

Background
Carl was born to Beverly Johnson and an unnamed father, in his family home, located on Grove Street in the Ganton district of Los Santos. Growing up, he got along well with his mother and siblings Sean (nicknamed "Sweet"), Kendl, and Brian, though not with his father, whom he barely remembers; as he states at one point, "[He] never really had a father." At a young age, Carl, Sweet, and Brian befriended Melvin "Big Smoke" Harris and Lance "Ryder" Wilson, who lived on the same street, and all five got involved in small-time criminal activities. After Sweet joined the Grove Street Families, one of the oldest and most powerful street gangs in Los Santos, he eventually became its leader and inducted Carl, Brian, Big Smoke, and Ryder into the gang.

By 1987, with the drug trade business expanding, most gangs in Los Santos began selling drugs in an effort to increase their power. However, Sweet's principles against drug-use prevented him from doing the same, causing the Families to slowly lose most of their influence and territories to their rivals. Around the same time, Brian was killed under unknown circumstances, most likely an attack by a rival gang, which Carl is implied to have witnessed, but did nothing to try and save his brother. This soured his relationships with his friends and family, especially with Sweet, who blamed him for the tragedy. After deciding that his life in Los Santos was unpromising, Carl cut his ties with everyone and moved to Liberty City, where he found work in stealing cars for Joey Leone.

Return to Los Santos
The game's main storyline begins with Carl flying back to Los Santos following the death of his mother in a drive-by shooting in 1992. Upon his arrival, Carl is confronted by LSPD Officers Frank Tenpenny, Edward "Eddie" Pulaski, and Jimmy Hernandez, three highly corrupt members of the city's community policing unit, C.R.A.S.H. Tenpenny and his associates warn Carl early on that they intend to frame him for the murder of police officer Ralph Pendlebury, whom C.R.A.S.H. had killed to prevent him from exposing their illegal activities. They also force Carl to do work for them in exchange for his and his family's safety.

After reuniting with Sweet, Kendl, Big Smoke, and Ryder, Carl learns that the Families have lost almost all of their territories to their main rivals, the Ballas, during his absence, and agrees to stay in Los Santos and help solve the gang's problems. While doing so, he befriends Kendl's boyfriend and Varrios Los Aztecas leader Cesar Vialpando, despite Sweet's initial objections, and helps his friend Jeffrey "OG Loc" Cross jumpstart his career as a rapper despite his lack of talent.

The Families' resurgence is short-lived, as Carl discovers that Big Smoke and Ryder have betrayed the gang by forming alliances with C.R.A.S.H. and the Ballas, and planned the attack that killed his mother, which was actually meant for Sweet, in an effort to eliminate the Families. While Carl uncovers this, Sweet is ambushed by a group of Ballas and wounded. Carl arrives to rescue him, but both brothers end up arrested by the police. While Sweet goes to prison awaiting trial, Carl is kidnapped by C.R.A.S.H., who take him to the countryside near Los Santos so that he can continue working for them. Tenpenny threatens to have Sweet killed if Carl attempts to return to Los Santos or intervene in C.R.A.S.H.'s dealings with Big Smoke, Ryder, and the Ballas, who have effectively taken over the city and flooded it with drugs.

Exile, new alliances and business ventures
During his time in the countryside, Carl befriends a hippie weed grower known as "The Truth", and performs several robberies alongside Cesar's aggressively psychotic cousin Catalina, with whom he enters a short-lived relationship. He also engages in a few illegal street races hosted by blind Triad leader Wu Zi Mu/"Woozie", in which he wins a defunct garage from Catalina's new boyfriend. Carl and his associates later travel to San Fierro, where they transform the garage into a vehicle chop shop with the help of several new allies, and purchase a car dealership and an RC shop. Carl later works for the local Triads, strengthening his ties with Woozie in the process, and infiltrates and destroys San Andreas' largest drug cartel, the Loco Syndicate, who supplied the Ballas with crack cocaine. In the process, he also exacts revenge on Ryder for his betrayal, killing him during a meeting with the syndicate's leaders. 

After eliminating the Loco Syndicate, Carl is contacted by its former leader, Mike Toreno, who reveals himself to be an undercover government agent, and enlists his help with several operations in exchange for Sweet's early release from prison. While working for Toreno, Carl purchases an abandoned airstrip in the desert, acquires a pilot's license, and steals a $60 million jetpack from a military base. He later travels to Las Venturas to help Woozie open a casino by robbing the rival Mafia-run casino, Caligula's Palace, after earning the mob's trust by working for Don Salvatore Leone. In the process, he befriends former Caligula's manager Ken Rosenberg, and helps him and his associates escape from Salvatore's clutches. During his stay in Las Venturas, Carl also rescues famous former rapper Madd Dogg, whose career he inadvertently ruined while helping OG Loc, from a suicide attempt, and continues to work for C.R.A.S.H., until they betray and try to kill him. Carl is saved by Officer Hernandez, who secretly betrayed his partners by reporting them to the internal affairs, and kills Pulaski after the latter murders Hernandez. Carl is later called by Sweet, who has been sentenced to life in prison, effectively removing Tenpenny's bargaining chip.

As Carl and his associates make plans to return to Los Santos, Madd Dogg asks Carl to become his manager and help him rebuild his career. Carl regains ownership of Madd Dogg's mansion in Los Santos, which the latter had sold to the Vagos gang for drugs, and restarts his career with the help of Rosenberg and his friends.

Tying up loose ends
Shortly after his return to Los Santos, Carl is contacted by Toreno for one final job. Upon completion, the latter honors their agreement and has Sweet released from prison. Although delighted to have his brother back, Sweet is not impressed with Carl's business ventures and chastises him for forgetting about their gang, before talking him into helping to rebuild the Families' strength once again. 

During this time, Tenpenny is tried for several charges, but is acquitted in his trial, causing all gang-occupied districts of Los Santos to riot. In the midst of the chaos, Carl reclaims the Families' lost turf from their rivals, and tracks down Big Smoke to his crack palace penthouse, where he kills him for his betrayal. Tenpenny then arrives to claim his share of Smoke's money and kill Carl, but the latter survives and pursues Tenpenny, who is driving a fire truck, with Sweet's help. The brothers' pursuit eventually causes Tenpenny to crash the fire truck outside Carl's family home, whereupon he dies from his injuries. With Tenpenny dead, the riots come to an abrupt end and all loose ends in Carl's life are resolved.

At the conclusion of the game, Carl and his allies are seen discussing what their future holds in the former's home, when Madd Dogg visits them to announce that he has won a gold record for his new album. As everyone celebrates, Carl leaves the house to check things out around the neighborhood.

Reception
The character of Carl Johnson received critical acclaim after the release of Grand Theft Auto: San Andreas, and has been included in many lists of the best characters in video games. Jesse Schedeen of IGN included CJ in his list of Grand Theft Auto Favorite Badasses, stating, "Of all the protagonists in all the GTA games, few are as compelling or flat out badass as Carl "CJ" Johnson," and also went on to praise the character customisation and available assets. Crave Online's Paul Tamburro placed Carl eighth in his Top 10 Most Memorable GTA Characters, stating that "it was refreshing to take control of a character who was considerate about when and when not to commit wanton mass-slaughtering." Matthew Cooper of Sabotage Times placed the character in his list of the top 10 characters in the Grand Theft Auto series, stating that Carl Johnson "was the first to appear with a conscience, the first that didn't seem to enjoy killing copious numbers of people."

GameDaily listed Carl among their list of the best black characters in video games, refusing the idea that he reinforces negative stereotypes since he is "more ghetto-born James Bond than straight-up gangsta". Similarly, Larry Hester of Complex Gaming placed Carl second on his list of the 10 Best Black Characters in Video Games, naming him the "gangbanger with a good heart." In 2012, GamesRadar placed Carl 77th on their list of the 100 Best Heroes in Video Games, saying that "few [Grand Theft Auto] heroes have been as charismatic as him, and few likely will in the future." UGO Networks have placed Carl as the second character who most deserves his own live-action film.

In 2008, The Age ranked Carl as the 33rd greatest Xbox character of all time, noting him as "the most humble" of Grand Theft Auto anti-heroes, and as "one of the first strong African-American lead characters in any major videogame." Although Carl ultimately did not make the cut, Game Informer staff considered his inclusion in their "30 characters that defined a decade" collection, with Matt Helgeson saying, "He could have easily been another gangster stereotype, but by the end of San Andreas we see CJ as a flawed, but ultimately good man who did the best he could in the worst of circumstances." In 2011, readers of Guinness World Records Gamer's Edition voted Carl "CJ" Johnson as the 22nd top video game character of all time.

References

Black characters in video games
Fictional African-American people
Fictional assassins in video games
Fictional characters from California
Fictional criminals in video games
Fictional American people in video games
Fictional aviators
Fictional businesspeople in video games
Fictional gamblers
Fictional gangsters
Fictional gang members
Fictional martial artists in video games
Fictional mass murderers
Fictional professional thieves
Fictional underbosses
Grand Theft Auto characters
Grand Theft Auto: San Andreas
Male characters in video games
Orphan characters in video games
Video game characters based on real people
Video game characters introduced in 2004
Video game mascots
Video game protagonists